Binibining Pilipinas 2011 was the 48th edition of Binibining Pilipinas. It was held at the Smart Araneta Coliseum in Quezon City, Metro Manila, Philippines on April 10, 2011.

At the end of the event, Venus Raj crowned Shamcey Supsup as Miss Universe Philippines 2011, Krista Kleiner crowned Dianne Necio as Binibining Pilipinas International 2011, and Czarina Gatbonton crowned Isabella Angela Manjon as Binibining Pilipinas Tourism 2011. Janine Mari Tugonon was named 1st Runner-Up and Mary Jean Lastimosa was named 2nd Runner-Up.

Starting this edition, the winners of Binibining Pilipinas will represent the Philippines in Miss Universe, Miss International, and Miss Tourism Queen International after losing its franchise for Miss World.

Results
Color keys
  The contestant was a Runner-up in an International pageant.
  The contestant was a Semi-Finalist in an International pageant.
  The contestant did not place.

Special Awards

Judges 
 Alex Cabagnot – Point Guard for San Miguel Beermen
 David Charlton – President and CEO of David's Salon, Inc.
 H.E. Hans Dannenberg – Non-Resident Ambassador of the Dominican Republic to the Philippines, Ambassador of the Dominican Republic in India
 Silvana Fornari – Wife of H.E. Luca Fornari – Ambassador Extraordinary and Plenipotentiary of the Embassy of the Republic of Italy
 Sec. Edwin Lacierda – Presidential Spokesperson
 Ernie Lopez – President and Founder of ABS-CBN Publishing, Triathlete
 Margie Moran-Floirendo – Miss Universe 1973, Managing Director of Pearl Farm Beach Resort Davao
 Cristino “Bong” Naguiat, Jr. – Chairman and CEO of Philippine Amusement and Gaming Corporation
 Gen. Eduardo Oban, Jr. – Chief of Staff of the Armed Forces of the Philippines
 Charo Santos-Concio – President and COO of ABS-CBN Corporation, Movie and TV Producer, Actress and TV Host
 Gilbert Simpao – Managing Director for Unilever Philippines – Hair Care and Skin Care Category
 Hugh Wilson – Consul General of the Embassy of Australia, Dean of the Consular Corps of the Philippines
 Anthony Charlemagne Yu – President and CEO of Megaworld Central Properties, Inc. and Empire East Holdings

Contestants
40 contestants competed for the three titles.

Notes

Post-pageant Notes 

 Shamcey Supsup competed at Miss Universe 2011 in São Paulo, Brazil and was named 3rd Runner-Up. Currently, Supsup is the National Director of the Miss Universe Philippines Organization.
 Dianne Necio competed at Miss International 2011 in Chengdu, China and was one of the fifteen semifinalists. She also won the Miss Internet Popularity award.
 Janine Tugonon competed again at Binibining Pilipinas 2012, where she was crowned Miss Universe Philippines 2012. She competed at Miss Universe 2012 in Las Vegas, Nevada and was named First Runner-Up. Mary Jean Lastimosa also competed in Binibining Pilipinas 2012 and was one of the fifteen semifinalists. Lastimosa competed for the third time in 2014 and was crowned Miss Universe Philippines 2014. She was one of the ten finalists at Miss Universe 2014 in Miami, Florida.
 Queenierich Rehman competed at Miss World Philippines 2012 and won. She competed at Miss World 2012 in Ordos, China and was one of the fifteen semifinalists. Rehman was also one of the Top 5 in the Talent competition.
 Angelia Gabrena Ong competed at Miss Philippines Earth 2015 and won. She competed at Miss Earth 2015 in Vienna, Austria and won.
 Elizabeth Clenci competed again at Binibining Pilipinas 2017 and was crowned Binibining Pilipinas Grand International 2017. She competed at Miss Grand International 2017 in Phú Quốc, Vietnam and was named 2nd Runner-Up.

References

2011
2011 in the Philippines
2011 beauty pageants